Korzeniowski (feminine: Korzeniowska; plural: Korzeniowscy) is a Polish surname. It may refer to:

 Joseph Conrad (1857–1924), born Józef Teodor Konrad Korzeniowski, Polish-British novelist
 Abel Korzeniowski (born 1972), Polish composer
 Apollo Korzeniowski (1820–1869), Polish poet
 Bonnie Korzeniowski (born 1941), Canadian politician
 Leszek Korzeniowski (born 1955), Polish politician
 Paweł Korzeniowski (born 1985), Polish swimmer
 Robert Korzeniowski (born 1968), Polish racewalker
 Sylwia Korzeniowska (born 1980), Polish-French racewalker

See also
 
 

Polish-language surnames